Brigitte Morillo (born 28 June 1960) is an Ecuadorian equestrian. She competed in the individual dressage event at the 1984 Summer Olympics.

References

External links
 

1960 births
Living people
Ecuadorian female equestrians
Ecuadorean dressage riders
Olympic equestrians of Ecuador
Equestrians at the 1984 Summer Olympics
Place of birth missing (living people)
21st-century Ecuadorian women